SUSUK
is a 2008 Malaysian Malay-language horror film which was released on 7 August 2008 in Malaysia. The film is directed by Amir Muhammad and Naeim Ghalili. The story concerns Soraya, who uses the forbidden practice of susuk to be famous.

Plot
Soraya is a young trainee nurse who is starting to feel disaffected by her life. A chance introduction to the world of glamour piques her earlier ambition to be a star. She does not succeed at first, but she is told that the forbidden practice of susuk can help. She has to make a choice whether to stay the way she is, or cross the line. At first, susuk seems to give her confidence in her performance, and even to stand up to her abusive brother-in-law.

Meanwhile, Suzana is a prominent diva with an air of mystery. She has long been a practitioner of the black arts due to her use of the extreme susuk keramat. Every time she violates a taboo, a human life is required - first in the form of accidental deaths of her loved ones, then by outright murder and cannibalism. She develops inhuman, supernatural abilities. At the same time, she yearns for her more innocent days and hires a young assistant who reminds her of "happier times".

A mysterious and powerful dukun guides the two women down their paths to corruption. The viewers follow the lives of these two women until their stories converge in the true secret of this dreaded charm.

Cast
 Diana Rafar as Soraya
 Ida Nerina as Suzana
 Adlin Aman Ramlie as Dukun Dewangga 
 Noorkhiriah as Mastura
 Gambit Saifullah as Kamal
 Sofea Jane as Mona
 Aleeza Kasim as Rozana
 Tengku Marina as Aini
 Anne Abdullah as Sasha
 Hairie Othman as Farish
 Chew Kin Wah as Producer Lee
 Jalaluddin Hassan as Producer Razman
 Baizura Kahar as Idola Marcella
 Liza Othman as Aliya, soraya mother's
 Wan Hanafi Su sebagai Bomoh Effendi

Special appearance
 Yasmin Yusoff as Host TV show
 Jaclyn Victor as herself
 Sharifah Aleya as Host a Talent Contest
 David Teo as Elderly Man
 Mazidul Akmal Sidek as TV Readers
 Rafidah Abdullah as PA Concert
 Soffi Jikan as Guitarist
 Yasmin Ahmad as Nurse
 Ramona Rahman as Suzana's Concert Guest
 Susan Lankester as Suzana's Concert Guest 
 Tony Eusoff as Suzana's Concert Guest

Scenes involving Jaclyn Victor, Waheeda, David Teo, and Sharifah Aleya however have been cut in the film editing process.

Awards and nominations
The film was nominated in nine categories in the 21st Malaysian Film Festival, 2008 and won three of the categories.

Won
 Best Actress Ida Nerina
 Best Poster
 Best Sound Effect - Daniel Tang

Nominated
 Best Film
 Best Costume Designer/Garment - Mohd Zaini
 Most Promising Actress - Diana Rafar
 Best Art Direction - Ting Lam
 Best Original Music Score - Hardesh Singh
 Best Cinematography - Daven R.
 Best Actor - Adlin Aman Ramlie

References

External links
 

2008 films
2008 horror films
2000s mystery films
Malay-language films
Malaysian horror films
Grand Brilliance films
Films directed by Amir Muhammad
Malaysian supernatural horror films